Taipei City electoral constituencies consist of 8 single-member constituencies, each represented by a member of the Legislative Yuan.

Current constituencies

Taipei City Constituency I - Beitou, Shilin (Lanya, Tianmu District)
Taipei City Constituency II - Datong, Shilin (Shezi, Hougang, Jieshang, Zhishan, Yangmingshan district)
Taipei City Constituency III - Zhongshan, Songshan (North Songshan, Dongshe, Sanmin district)
Taipei City Constituency IV - Neihu, Nangang
Taipei City Constituency V - Wanhua, Zhongzheng (Wall of Taipei, Dongmen, Nanmen, Kanding district)
Taipei City Constituency VI - Daan
Taipei City Constituency VII - Xinyi, Songshan (South Songshan, Zhonglun, Benzhen district)
Taipei City Constituency VIII - Wenshan, Zhongzheng (South Zhongzheng, Guting, Gongguan district)

Legislators

Diane Lee resigned in 2009 due to citizenship issues.

Pasuya Yao resigned in 2018 to focus on his Taipei mayoral election campaign.

Election results

2016

2019 By-election

2020

References

Legislative Yuan constituencies
Politics of Taipei